Morgans Hotel may refer to:
Morgans Hotel, a boutique hotel located on Madison Avenue, New York City
Morgans Hotel Group, a hospitality company that operates, owns, acquires and redevelops boutique hotels in the United States and Europe
Morgans Hotel, Swansea, a boutique hotel in Swansea, not part of the Morgans Hotel Group.